This is a list of mines in Peru.

References

Peru